Stanley Timothy Crews (April 3, 1961 – March 23, 1993) was a Major League Baseball pitcher who played six seasons with the Los Angeles Dodgers from  to . Crews was part of the Dodgers team that won the 1988 World Series. At the end of the 1992 season, he became a free agent and signed with the Cleveland Indians on January 22, 1993. 

On March 23, 1993, during spring training, Crews and his Indians teammate Steve Olin were killed in a boating accident on Crews' property on Little Lake Nellie in Clermont, Florida. Another teammate, Bob Ojeda, suffered serious head injuries and spent most of the season recovering. An investigation later found that Crews had driven the boat too fast into an unlighted dock and was impaired by a blood alcohol level of 0.14.  

In their memory, the Cleveland Indians wore a patch on their jerseys bearing both players' uniform numbers during the 1993 season. The Dodgers, Crews' former team, also wore a patch bearing his uniform number during the 1993 season.

In 281 major league appearances, almost all in relief, Crews compiled a record of 11–13 with a 3.44 earned run average in 423.2 innings. He recorded 15 saves.

See also
 List of baseball players who died during their careers

References

External links

 Little Lake Nellie: A Decade Later

1961 births
1993 deaths
Accidental deaths in Florida
Albuquerque Dukes players
Alcohol-related deaths in Florida
American expatriate baseball players in Canada
Baseball players from Tampa, Florida
Boating accident deaths
Burlington Bees players
C. Leon King High School alumni
El Paso Diablos players
Los Angeles Dodgers players
Major League Baseball pitchers
Stockton Ports players
Valencia Matadors baseball players
Vancouver Canadians players